Victoria Township is a township in Ellis County, Kansas, USA.  As of the 2010 census, its population was 876.

Geography
According to the USGS, it contains two cemeteries: Saint Boniface and Saint George.

The streams of Mud Creek and North Fork Big Creek run through this township.

References
 USGS Geographic Names Information System (GNIS)

External links
 US-Counties.com
 City-Data.com

Townships in Ellis County, Kansas
Townships in Kansas